John Gordon Crammond (5 July 1906 – 18 September 1978) was a British skeleton racer who competed in the late 1940s. He won the bronze medal in the men's skeleton event at the 1948 Winter Olympics in St. Moritz.

References
British Olympic Association profile
DatabaseOlympics.com profile
FIBT men's skeleton results: 1928-2005
Skeletonsport.com profile

1906 births
1978 deaths
British male skeleton racers
Olympic skeleton racers of Great Britain
Skeleton racers at the 1948 Winter Olympics
Olympic bronze medallists for Great Britain
Olympic medalists in skeleton
Medalists at the 1948 Winter Olympics